Dong Luang is a district (amphoe) of Mukdahan province, northeastern Thailand.

Geography
Neighbouring districts are (from the south clockwise) Mueang Mukdahan and Khamcha-i of Mukdahan Province; Khao Wong and Na Khu of Kalasin province; Tao Ngoi of Sakon Nakhon province; and Na Kae and That Phanom of Nakhon Phanom province.

History
The minor district (king amphoe) was established on 1 April 1977, when the three tambons Dong Luang, Kok Tum, and Nong Bua were split off from Na Kae district. When Mukdahan Province was created in 1982, Dong Luang was one of districts forming the new province, and became reassigned to be a subordinate of Mueang Mukdahan District. The minor district was upgraded to a full district on 16 July 1984.

Administration 
The district is divided into six sub-districts (tambon), which are further subdivided into 57 villages (muban). There are no municipal (thesaban) areas, and six tambon administrative organization (TAO).

2020 lost girl
On 11 May 2020, a nationally renowned event occurred here. When a 3-year-old local girl named Orawan "Nong Chompoo" Wongsricha mysteriously disappeared from her home in Kok Kok Village, Kok Tum Subdistrict. More than 500 police from Bangkok jointly investigated the case. There are many suspects, which are all local men. But after more than 2 months, still unable to arrest the murderer. 

Until 2 June 2021 (after 388 days), the police issued an arrest warrant for Chaiphol "Lung Phol" Wipha, the girl's uncle-in-law.

References

External links
amphoe.com (Thai)

Dong Luang